Malini Subramaniam (born c.1964) is an Indian independent journalist, former head of the Chhattisgarh chapter of the International Committee of the Red Cross, and a regular contributor for India-based internet based Scroll.in reporting on human rights abuses from where she lived in the city of Jagdalpur in the Bastar district of the Chhattisgarh state. She was viewed as a supporter of the Maoists and driven from Jagdapur by anti-Moaists and authorities.

Career
Subramaniam is a contributor to the news website Scroll.In. She has been reporting on human rights issues in Bastar, Chhattisgarh. Her reports contained information on abuses committed by the police and security personnel, sexual violence against women, the illegal jailing of minors, the shutdown of schools, extrajudicial killings and threats against journalists. She was the subject of harassment from police and men in the community.

Malini Subramaniam formerly lived in her Bastar home with her family. Throughout her career she has been interrogated, followed, and harassed by police and members of a pro-police vigilante group.

On the evening of February 7, 2016, a group of approximately twenty individuals congregated in front of Subramaniam's home with a goal to pin her neighbors against her and to provoke them to join in on the attacks. The next morning, February 8, 2016, her home was attacked by a group associated with Samajik Ekta Manch, who are anti-Maoists. They threw stones at her home and car windows shattering the glass of her car. She attempted to gain help through a police investigation but was essentially ignored. On February 18, 2016, Subramaniam and her family were forced to leave her home by eviction notice. It is believed that her landlord was threatened to do so. Through all of the struggle Subramaniam refuses to give up and plans to go back to Bastar whenever the time is right.

Context
The harassment of Malini Subramaniam is part of a larger attack on activists, lawyers and journalists standing up against abuses committed by police in the Bastar District. One politician called journalists "presstitudes" to feed into the negative climate around 2016. Investigations have been ongoing in the region pertaining to human rights because of a long going confrontation between government forces and Maoist rebels trying to take over the region. The India Today news channel conducted one investigation that tied police together with Samajik Ekta Manch. Police pressure journalists to serve as information delivers and jail those of report badly on them. Several journalists have been killed in this area for reporting on critical content.

The anti-Maoist organization Samajik Ekta Manch was banned April 15, 2016, as a result of activities like those directed at Subramaniam

Reactions
The members of the Network of Women in Media, India, strongly expressed their disdain of the attack on Subramaniam.

Joel Simon, CPJ executive director, expressed his reasoning behind honoring Subramaiam with the International Press Freedom Award. He recognized her for risking her life to report to society and global community the critical news events happening around her.

Awards
In 2016, Subramaniam won an International Press Freedom Award from the Committee to Protect Journalists. She won the 2017 Oxfam Novib/PEN Award for Freedom of Expression.

References

External links
Much Rack

1964 births
Living people
Journalists from Chhattisgarh
Indian human rights activists
Indian women journalists
Women writers from Chhattisgarh
20th-century Indian journalists
20th-century Indian women